Konstantin Kalinovsky (born 3 September 1975) is a Belarusian skier. He competed in the Nordic combined event at the 1998 Winter Olympics.

References

1975 births
Living people
Belarusian male Nordic combined skiers
Olympic Nordic combined skiers of Belarus
Nordic combined skiers at the 1998 Winter Olympics
Place of birth missing (living people)